Nipigon may refer to:

Places in Thunder Bay District of Ontario, Canada
 Nipigon Township
 Lake Nipigon
 Nipigon River
 Nipigon Bay of northern Lake Superior
 Nipigon Embayment
 Lake Nipigon Indian Reserve

Canadian Navy ships
 , a Bangor-class minesweeper that served in World War II
 , an Annapolis-class destroyer that served during the Cold War

Other uses
 Nipigon (crater), an impact crater on Mars